Medal of Heroism may refer to:

 Medal of Heroism (Czech Republic), an award of the Czech Republic
 ROTC Medal for Heroism, an award of the Department of the Army for ROTC cadets
 Armed Forces Medal for Heroic Deeds, presented by Norway